Qinarjeh-ye Sofla (also Romanized as Qīnarjeh-ye Soflá; also known as Qanīzjeh-ye Soflá) is a village in Charuymaq-e Jonubesharqi Rural District, Shadian District, Charuymaq County, East Azerbaijan Province, Iran. At the 2006 census, its population was 100, in 17 families.

References 

Populated places in Charuymaq County